GS Boyz (explicitly G-Spot Boyz) are an American hip hop group from Arlington, Texas, formed in 2005.  The group gained national popularity and sold over 1 million records under Sony Music, RCA Records, and MWN Music Group after nationally distributing their debut single "Stanky Legg," which was independently released in September 2008 by Todd J. Alexander, Cornelious Brock the Founder of MWN Music Group.

The Official GS Boyz released a new single in September 2017 titled "Off Top".

Biography
The members of GS Boyz were friends at Bowie High School in Arlington. GS Boyz had many regional hits in its early stages, including "Hit the G-Spot", "Twisted", "He Don't Deserve You", and "First Time.", signed to Yung Joc's label Swagg Team Entertainment in November 2008. Before signing with a major label, the group's debut single "Stanky Legg" peaked at #49 on the Billboard Hot 100 and #7 on the Hot Rap Tracks chart. Its music video topped the countdown on BET's 106 & Park in February 2009. The group also released a remix of "Stanky Legg" with Trina. "Stanky Legg" is based on a dance movement from Dallas TX .

According to Shaheem Reid of MTV News, the "Stanky Legg" dance is part of Dallas's "D-Town Boogie" scene. The GS Boyz performed the dance on Snoop Dogg's talk show on MTV, Dogg After Dark. They asserted to the world that they compose more than only "dance songs".

Discography

Singles

Awards and nominations
BET Awards
2009: Best Group (nominated)

References

American hip hop groups
American crunk groups
African-American musical groups
Jive Records artists
Musical groups established in 2005
Musical groups disestablished in 2012
Musical groups from Texas
American musical trios
Southern hip hop groups